Ronald Arthur Overton Hickling (1912 – 18 October 2006) was a British ornithologist.  He served as president of the Leicestershire and Rutland Ornithological Society.  He died in Rothley, Leicestershire, at the age of 93.

Publications
Books authored by Hickling include:

 1978 – The Birds of Leicestershire and Rutland. Leicestershire & Rutland Ornithological Society. 
 1983 – Enjoying Ornithology: a celebration of fifty years of the British Trust for Ornithology, 1933-1983. Poyser:Calton.  (editor and compiler)
 1988 – Birds at Gibraltar Point: a systematic list covering the years 1949 to 1987. Lincolnshire and South Humberside Trust for Nature Conservation.  (with Stephen Davies)
 1996 – James Harley: a Leicestershire Naturalist, 1801-1860. Leicestershire Museums, Arts & Records Service.

Honours
 1957 – Bernard Tucker Medal of the British Trust for Ornithology
 1979 – Honorary Master of Science degree from Leicester University
 1983 – Bernard Tucker Medal of the British Trust for Ornithology

References

1912 births
2006 deaths
British ornithologists
20th-century British zoologists